Kelly is an unincorporated community in Campbell County, Virginia, United States.

Mount Athos, which is listed on the National Register of Historic Places, is located in Kelly.

References

Unincorporated communities in Campbell County, Virginia
Unincorporated communities in Virginia